Marianna Gódorné Nagy (born 30 August 1957) is a former Hungarian handball player and Olympic medalist. With her 281 matches played for the Hungarian national team, she is the all-time record-holder.

Career

Nagy started her career in her hometown club Csornai SE. In 1976 she moved to Budapest to study on the University of Physical Education and to play for their team. Nagy graduated in 1980 and signed to Vasas SC yet in that year. She spent six years with the red and blues, during which time she won a number of domestic titles and obtained the Champions Cup. In 1986 she moved abroad to play for Bayer Leverkusen, the team that was coached by her husband, Mihály Gódor, whom she met during his university years. Nagy switched to Hypobank Südstadt in 1988; with them she has made the Austrian championship and Champions Cup double two times in row.

She played 281 times for the Hungarian national team between 1974 and 1987 and won a number of medals, including an Olympic Games bronze in 1976 and a World Championship silver in 1982.

Following her good performances in Hypo, Nagy, who was not a member of the Hungarian basis for that time, received an invitation from the Austrian Handball Federation to represent Austria on international level. Nagy accepted the offer and played over one hundred times for Austria until her retirement.

After Nagy gave up professional handball,  she settled with her husband in Szentgyörgyvölgy, where they run a hotel with a sports and fitness center in the countryside. Nagy also coaches the handball club of Lenti, which plays in the county championship, while her husband serves as the assistant coach of the Austrian women's national team.

Achievements
Nemzeti Bajnokság I:
Winner: 1981, 1982, 1984, 1985
Magyar Kupa:
Winner: 1981, 1982, 1983, 1985
Women Handball Austria:
Winner: 1989, 1990, 1991
ÖHB Cup:
Winner: 1990, 1991
Champions Cup:
Winner: 1982, 1989, 1990
Olympic Games:
Bronze Medalist: 1976
World Championship:
Silver Medalist: 1982
Bronze Medalist: 1975, 1978

Awards and recognition
Hungarian Handballer of the Year: 1979, 1980, 1981, 1982, 1985

References

External links
Profile on Databaseolympics
Vasas SC profile

1957 births
Living people
People from Csorna
Hungarian female handball players
Handball players at the 1976 Summer Olympics
Handball players at the 1980 Summer Olympics
Olympic handball players of Hungary
Olympic bronze medalists for Hungary
Olympic medalists in handball
Expatriate handball players
Hungarian expatriate sportspeople in Austria
Hungarian expatriate sportspeople in Germany
Medalists at the 1976 Summer Olympics
Sportspeople from Győr-Moson-Sopron County